This is a list of programs broadcast by RJDigiTV 29, a UHF digital independent TV station owned by Rajah Broadcasting Network. It was known as 2nd Avenue from 2008 to 2018, before it reverted to its own programming.

Current programming

Music
 Bravo Executive Lounge 
 The Drive Time Show with DJ Jamie 
 RJ Sunday Jam 
 Thank God it's RJ 
 Let's Groove with Roaring 20's Band

Archival programming
 RJ Video Vault 
 Choice Concerts

Cartoons
 Classic Cartoons 
 Looney Tunes
 Merrie Melodies
 Popeye: The Sailor Man 
 Superman 
 Felix the Cat
 Betty Boop 
 Private Snafu 
 Little Audrey 
 Mighty Max 
 Cartoon Funnies
 Crusader Rabbit 
 Kissyfur Bear Roots
 The New 3 Stooges

Movie blocks
 Classic Movies

Informercials
 TV Shop Philippines

Religious
 Power to Unite with Elvira

Upcoming programs

Cartoons
 Challenge of the Gobots (2022)
 The Flintstones (2022)
 The Huckleberry Hound Show (2022)
 Jabberjaw (2022)
 The Jetsons (2022)
 Magilla Gorilla (2022)
 The Quick Draw McGraw Show (2022)
 Tom and Jerry (2022)
 Top Cat (2022)
 The Yogi Bear Show (2022)

Previously aired on RJDigiTV

See also
Rajah Broadcasting Network

RJTV, List of programs broadcast by
RJTV